Chal Homa (also Romanized as Chāl Homā; also known as Chālmeh and Chhālma) is a village in Hendudur Rural District, Sarband District, Shazand County, Markazi Province, Iran. At the 2006 census, its population was 405, in 93 families.

References 

Populated places in Shazand County